Arthrobacter paludis is a Gram-positive, non-endospore-forming and strictly aerobic bacterium from the genus Arthrobacter which has been isolated from hydric soil from Seogmo Island, Korea.

References 

Micrococcaceae
Bacteria described in 2018